Rod Michael (born February 17, 1985) is an American pop singer. He signed with BMG Deutschland GmbH (German arm of BMG) in 2001.

In B3

Michael was born in Allentown, Pennsylvania.  In 2001, he became a founding member of a boy band called B3, alongside Tim Cruz and John Steven Sutherland. Rod Michael left the band at end of 2002 and was replaced by Blair Madison Late. Michael had recorded with them First, their most successful album that went gold in Germany. B3's biggest hit was "I.O.I.O.", a cover of a Bee Gees song that was #4 in Germany in 2002 and was in charts in many European and Asian countries (including Austria, Switzerland, Poland, Hungary, the Czech Republic, Thailand).

Solo career
At end of 2002 Rod Michael went solo. In June 2003, he released his first solo single was "My Prerogative", a cover version of the Bobby Brown classic. Then in 2004 released his second single under BMG entitle "someday" and then an album "The Next Episode" but over some political repercussions from leaving b3 came back to haunt him and it wasn't given the promotion it deserved, so he cut ties with the label and went back stateside to restart his career in the U.S.  He has written more than 60 original songs.

After success in Europe, in January 2008, "1720 Entertainment" distributed his first solo US release entitled "Knight in Shining Armor", which got heavy rotation on sirius and xm radio and certain markets across the US and cracked the hot 100, the song became an internet underground RnB hit which gave Michael credibility to build on as he shed the boyband title and grew into his own as a legit solo artist with a definitive vocal sound and delivery that got comparison's to the king of pop himself Michael Jackson.

The Voice
Michael took part in the blind auditions for the third season of the American singing competition The Voice. His audition was broadcast on October 1, 2012 on the last day of the blind auditions. He sang "Please Don't Go", a Mike Posner song. Michael was eliminated. The judges said Michael sounded great, but too much like the original and did not feel it was a strong song choice.

Discography

Albums
with B3: 
First (February 2002)
Solo Albums
The Next Episode (March 2004)
Intro feat. Caramel  (01:14) 
Someday (03:53) 
Sadie (04:02) 
My Prerogative feat. Caramel (04:09) 
Dirty Love feat. Silvashado & Caramel (03:40) 
X Boyfriend (03:21) 
Here Comes Love Again  (03:18) 
The Way U Are (03:38) 
Supernatural (03:10) 
Song 4 U (03:02) 
Nothing But Trouble  (03:06) 
Dreams (03:09) 
Show U The Way (02:41) 
When I Think Of U (06.55)

Singles
Singles with B3: 
"You Win Again" (2001)
"Nightfever" (2002)
"I.O.I.O." (2002)
Solo singles
"My Prerogative" (May 2003) (CD)
"Someday" (2004) (CD)
"Knight in Shining Armor" (2008)
Collaborations
Can't Believe It (T-Pain featuring Rod Michael)

References

External links
Rod Michael Official site
Rod Michael Yhaoo page

1985 births
Living people
American male pop singers
The Voice (franchise) contestants
B3 (band) members
21st-century American singers
21st-century American male singers